Harrogate Rugby Union Football Club is an English rugby union team based in Harrogate, North Yorkshire. The club runs four senior sides. The first team play in National League 2 North, having been promoted from the North Premier in 2019–20. The second team, Harrogate Georgians, play in the Yorkshire RFU Merit Premiership and the third team play in the Yorkshire RFU 2 Central/North Merit League. The club also fields a ladies' team completing the four senior teams (Harrogate Ladies) in the RFUW Championship, and eight junior teams (from ages 6 to 16).

History

The team was founded in 1871 as Harrogate Football Club, the same year as the Rugby Football Union, and played its first match on 16 December that year. It moved to Dragon Fields in 1875 and then moved to Claro Road in 1896. In 1903, the club played Canada and two years later it won the Yorkshire Cup for the first time. In 1914, the club decided to concentrate on football and rugby union activities were split off into a new club called Harrogate Old Boys. In 1923, a club called Harrogate RUFC was formed and RUFC and Old Boys amalgamated in 1936, although it was only in 1945 that the merged club officially became known as Harrogate RUFC. In 1957, the club merged with Harrogate Georgians and the decision was taken to retain the Georgians' name by naming the second XV Harrogate Georgians. When the leagues were formed in 1987, the club was placed in North 1. Subsequent promotions resulted in Harrogate joining the third tier for the 1994–95 season and it remained at that level for thirteen seasons. However, the club has been relegated twice and is playing in regional rugby for the first time in more than twenty years.

Harrogate's most successful season was 2001–02 when it finished fourth in the league, won the Yorkshire Cup and won the National 7s competition. In 2015, the club won the Yorkshire Cup for the tenth time. At the start of the 2015–16 season, after a wait of fifteen years, Harrogate moved from its old ground of Claro Road (where it had been for 119 years) to a new location at Rudding Lane. On 15 September 2015 Harrogate played its first game at Rudding Lane – beating local rivals Otley 15 – 10 in front of a club record crowd of 1,050 in the 2015–16 National League 2 North.

Current standings

Honours
 Division 4 North: 
 Winners (1): 1992–93
 National 7s: 
 Winners (1): 2001–02
 Runner-up (1): 2002–03
 Yorkshire Cup: 
 Winners (12): 1905, 1907, 1949, 1965, 1981, 1991, 1992, 2002, 2003, 2015, 2016, 2017
 National League 3 (north v midlands) promotion play-off:
 Winners (1): 2012–13
 North Premier
 Runner-up (promoted from level 5): 2019–20

Women's team honours
Women's Championship North 2
Winners (1): 2018–19
Women's North 1 East
Winners (1): 2017–18
 Women's NC North 2 East
 Runners-up (1): 2016–17
 Women's Junior Plate
 Runners-up (1): 2017

League record

 1993–94 Division 4: 2nd — promoted
 1994–95 Division 3: 7th
 1995–96 Division 3: 6th
 1996–97 Division 3: 5th
 1997–98 National Division 1: 14th
 1998–99 National Division 1: 12th
 1999–00 National Division 1: 6th
 2000–01 National Division 1: 5th 
 2001–02 National Division 2: 4th 
 2002–03 National Division 2: 4th
 2003–04 National Division 2: 8th
 2004–05 National Division 2: 10th
 2005–06 National Division 2: 13th — avoided relegation due to league reshuffle.
 2006–07 National Division 2: 14th — relegated
 2007–08 National Division 3 North: 6th
 2008–09 National Division 3 North: 5th
 2009–10 National League 2 North: 4th
 2010–11 National League 2 North: 6th
 2011–12 National League 2 North: 14th — relegated
 2012–13 National League 3 North: 2nd — promoted
 2013–14 National League 2 North: 9th
 2014–15 National League 2 North: 4th
 2015–16 National League 2 North: 7th
 2016–17 National League 2 North: 14th — relegated
 2017–18 North Premier: 3rd
 2018–19 North Premier: 3rd
 2019–20 North Premier: 2nd — promoted
 2020–21 National League 2 North: league not contested due to the COVID-19 pandemic in the United Kingdom
 2021–22 National League 2 North: 16th (relegation avoided due to league reorganisation)

International players
At least twelve former Harrogate players have gone on to win international caps.

 Jonathan Callard
 Peter Glover
 Peter Larter
 Roger Shackleton
 Peter Squires
 Carlton Troop
 Martyn Wood
 Thomas Grant
 Jeff Young
 Simon Easterby
 Guy Easterby
 Lee Feurer

References

External links
 Official website

1871 establishments in England
English rugby union teams
Rugby clubs established in 1871
Sport in Harrogate
Rugby union in Yorkshire